Benson Taylor  (born Mark Davison 10 September 1983), is an English composer, music producer, and humanitarian who is best known for producing music for film. His style of music has a British influence, often working a classic film score sound amongst electronics, and other musical settings.

Taylor won the "Best Original Music" award at the 2014 Monaco International Film Festival. In 2018, he scored and produced the music to Mathew Cullen's thriller adaptation of the Martin Amis novel, London Fields, starring Billy Bob Thornton, Amber Heard, Cara Delevingne, Theo James and Johnny Depp. In 2020, he scored the music for the film, Chick Fight, starring Bella Thorne, Alec Baldwin & Malin Akerman, for which he also served as executive producer.

In November 2016, Taylor was awarded an honorary doctorate for services to humanitarian causes & music.

He founded A Remarkable Idea in 2017, a sub label of Universal Music, located in Santa Monica, California. Taylor has collaborated and produced artists for the label, including Mercury Prize-nominated Maxïmo Park and Kele Okereke, Bloc Party, Good Charlotte’s Billy Martin, Pulled Apart by Horses, Robot Koch, Lack of Afro, MOBO-winning Kairos 4Tet, Benoît Pioulard, Bo Ningen, James Brown, Menace Beach, and The Halle Orchestra.

Taylor is an goodwill ambassador for the UK aid agency CAFOD, part of Caritas Internationalis, and a goodwill ambassador for the Cambodian Children's Trust. He is patron of the British charity, Music and the Deaf. Taylor was appointed the first ambassador of the Leeds Conservatoire, and in November 2021, he was installed as the first honorary Composer in Residence at the University of Huddersfield, both in the United Kingdom.

Life and career 
Born in Brontë Country, Bradford, Taylor later studied composition at the University of California, Los Angeles. After UCLA in 2009, he mentored with American composer, Mark Mancina, and studied privately with orchestrator, Hummie Mann.

He began writing music at a young age, whilst working as a radio producer. He later opened a studio in England, writing scores for American television, including Two and a Half Men, 30 Rock, 90210, and The Big Bang Theory, as well as producing music for the Super Bowl between 2010 and 2014. Taylor's music has been widely used across international advertising campaigns, including Nissan in 2017, McDonald's in 2018, Jose Cuervo's 2015 campaign and a collaboration in 2011 with CeeLo Green for the Las Vegas Tourist Board.

In 2011, Taylor made his London West End theatre debut co-composing the electronic music for Derek Bond's production of the play Many Moons.

In June 2013, music publishers Fairwood Music announced that they had added Taylor to their roster of artists which includes David Bowie, U2, Cat Stevens, The Average White Band, Bob Marley, and J.J. Cale. Taylor told British magazine Music Week, "I'm extremely humbled to join their roster, amongst some of the most recognised talents in the world. Here's hoping some of it will rub off on me!"

In November 2014, Taylor was a Grand Juror at the Tallinn Black Nights Film Festival alongside director Tomasz Wasilewski.

In 2016, Taylor produced soundtracks for US talk shows, including, Late Night With Seth Meyers and Jimmy Kimmel Live. He has twice contributed music to the Netflix produced series, Orange Is the New Black. Taylor's music has also appeared in the sixth series of Justified, the first series of How to Get Away with Murder, the second series of Ray Donovan, and in the 2015 Kroll Show.

Taylor scored and produced the music to Mathew Cullen's thriller, London Fields in 2015, starring Billy Bob Thornton, Theo James, Cara Delevingne, Amber Heard and Johnny Depp. Due to legal problems between the director and producers, the film was not released until September 2018, three years after Taylor had finished the musical score. As well as writing the musical score, Taylor collaborated with Toydrum and Bat for Lashes to cover Patsy Cline's "Walkin' After Midnight", and also with James Bagshaw from the British band Temples, covering "How Do You Sleep" from John Lennon's Imagine album, both tracks were recorded specifically for the film.

In December 2021, Taylor's music was performed by an orchestra and the Italian Mayor of Florence, Dario Nardella, in a returning Christmas tradition celebrating the city and its residents. The concert took place in the Salone Dei Cinquecento in Florence's Palazzo Vecchio.

Taylor is a professional member of the British Academy of Songwriters, Composers and Authors. He was styled as the "New Sound of Hollywood" by MovieScope magazine in its 24th issue in 2011.

He is a guest DJ on NTS Radio.

Business ventures
In 2017, Taylor founded A Remarkable Idea, a music label based in Santa Monica in Los Angeles, and in London. The label produces music for film, television and video games. Taylor has collaborated with artists for A Remarkable Idea including Maxïmo Park and Kele Okereke of Bloc Party, Pulled Apart by Horses, Robot Koch, Lack of Afro, Kairos 4Tet, Bo Ningen, Good Charlotte’s Billy Martin, Benoît Pioulard and The Halle orchestra. Taylor previously ran his label, Insidious Music, which is now defunct after being sold.

The label has licensed music to television shows such as Grey's Anatomy, House, Revenge, Unusual Suspects, Breaking Bad, Masterchef, Gordon Ramsay's Kitchen Nightmares, White Collar, The Oprah Winfrey Show, 24 and NFL on Fox.

In October 2019, Transgressive Records released Taylor's song Is This Thing On?'' with the band Pulled Apart By Horses

In March 2014, through his publishing company, Taylor licensed a large catalogue of musical works in partnership with Peter Gabriel's CueSongs, and a smaller subsidiary of the catalogue to the Japanese national broadcaster, Nippon Hōsō Kyōkai. Taylor said in an interview with WQXR-FM that it was his intention for the catalogue to grow, and to further develop collaborations with artists around the world, specifically in the middle and far east.

He frequently records with the British orchestra, The Hallé, and they regularly perform his works in concert. As part of his commercial recordings in 2015, he developed a short term education programme for students.

Personal life 
Taylor splits his time between Tuscany, Yorkshire, and Los Angeles. He is married and has two children, who have dual citizenship in both the United Kingdom and Italy.

His third great grandfather, George Davison, was the maternal uncle of John D. Rockefeller. Taylor is Roman Catholic.

Humanitarian and activism work 
Taylor supports several charities globally, including and was one of the founding committee members of the homeless charity Emmaus Bradford in West Yorkshire, England. He is also a goodwill ambassador for the Cambodian Children's Trust in Battambang, which works towards freeing children from severe poverty, and alongside the Cambodian government to end orphan tourism. Taylor is the patron of the charity, Music and the Deaf, based in Britain.

Alongside Patrick Stewart, Lena Headey and Jodie Whittaker, in 2017, Taylor took part in a photography exhibition in Huddersfield raising awareness around the downgrading of services at Huddersfield Royal Infirmary. He spoke of his children being born there.

Taylor is a known supporter of the NGO Médecins Sans Frontières, and the United Nations Refugee Agency, producing music to support their awareness campaigns. He has worked alongside the World Food Programme for several years promoting zero hunger in Syria, Lebanon, Jordan, Cambodia, and on the African continent. In June 2018, he travelled to the Bidi Bidi Refugee Settlement in Uganda with the WFP to raise awareness for World Refugee Day. Whilst in Uganda, he worked alongside refugee musicians from South Sudan.

He is an ambassador for the international aid agency for the catholic church, CAFOD, working to raise global awareness and fight poverty and injustice in communities across Africa, Asia and Latin America.

In 2016, he was appointed the first ambassador of the music conservatoire, Leeds College of Music in the United Kingdom.

On 26 June 2018, Alzheimer's Research UK released an educational film produced by Aardman Animations. The film was narrated by Simon Pegg and the music was produced by Taylor. It went viral that morning after being shared by the actor Stephen Fry, former British prime minister, David Cameron, Jeff Bridges, Richard Branson, film director Ron Howard and actors Andy Serkis & Bryan Cranston.

Recognition and honors
In 2014, Taylor became a fellow of the Royal Society of Arts in London, and in November 2016 was also honoured with an honorary degree from University of Bradford for his services to humanitarian causes. In November 2021, Taylor was installed as the first Composer in Residence at the University of Huddersfield.

Musical works

Film scores

Recent TV scores

Video games

Awards and honours
In November 2016, Kate Swann awarded Taylor with an honorary doctorate from the University of Bradford for his services to music and humanitarian causes. In November 2021, Taylor was installed as the first Composer in Residence at the University of Huddersfield.

Taylor was honoured with a Fellowship of the Royal Society of Arts in 2015.

He won Best Original Music for his score to Fear Of Water at the 2014 Monaco International Film Festival as judged by film director Roland Joffé.

See also 
 List of English people
 List of soundtrack composers
 List of ambient music artists
 List of people from Bradford

References

External links 

 Official Website
 
 
 

Living people
English film score composers
English male film score composers
British male classical composers
British classical composers
21st-century classical composers
English classical composers
English electronic musicians
Ambient musicians
Video game composers
English experimental musicians
English record producers
UCLA School of the Arts and Architecture alumni
English Roman Catholics
People educated at Bradford Grammar School
Musicians from Bradford
1983 births
21st-century British male musicians